The Philippines competed at the 1964 Summer Olympics in Tokyo, Japan. 47 competitors (40 men and 7 women) took part in 45 events spread across 10 sports. The Philippines won the first Olympic silver medal in these games, as well as their first medal in boxing since 1932.

Medalists

Silver

Athletics

Nelly Restar

Boxing

Men's Featherweight
 Anthony Villanueva

Cycling

Four cyclists represented the Philippines in 1964.

 Individual road race
 Arturo Romeo
 Daniel Olivares
 Cornelio Padilla
 Norberto Arceo

 Team time trial
 Norberto Arceo
 Daniel Olivares
 Cornelio Padilla
 Arturo Romeo

Gymnastics

Judo

Sailing

Shooting

Nine shooters represented the Philippines in 1964.

25 m pistol
 Horacio Miranda
 Paterno Miranda

50 m pistol
 Edgar Bond
 Mariano Ninonuevo

300 m rifle, three positions
 Leopoldo Ang
 Bernardo San Juan

50 m rifle, three positions
 Adolfo Feliciano
 Martin Gison

50 m rifle, prone
 Adolfo Feliciano
 Pacifico Salandanan

Swimming

Weightlifting

Men's Light Heavyweight
 Artemio Rocamora

Wrestling

References

External links
Official Olympic Reports
International Olympic Committee results database

Nations at the 1964 Summer Olympics
1964
Summer Olympics